The Roman Catholic Diocese of Albany covers the Capital District (Albany, Schenectady, Rensselaer, and Saratoga counties), as well as Warren, Washington, Greene, Columbia, Schoharie, Otsego, Delaware, Fulton, Montgomery, southern Herkimer, and extreme southeastern Hamilton counties in New York state. In these fourteen counties, there are over 100 parishes, along with a number of parish missions, divided among 14 deaneries, 7 vicariates and 29 "local Catholic communities".

For a list of closed churches and suppressed parishes, see List of suppressed parishes in the Roman Catholic Diocese of Albany.

Adirondack Vicariate

Vicar: Very Reverend Joseph G. Busch, E.V.
Battenkill Catholic Cluster:
Holy Cross Church (Salem) – Established in 1859
Notre Dame-Visitation Church (Schuylerville) – Established in 1889; formed from merger of Notre Dame de Lourdes and Visitation of the Blessed Virgin Mary (later Our Lady of the Visitation)
St. Joseph's Church (Greenwich) – Established in 1878
St. Patrick's Church (Cambridge) – Established in 1856
Blessed Sacrament Church (Bolton Landing) – Established in 1929
Holy Mother and Child Parish (Lake Luzerne/Corinth) – Established in 2009 from a merger of Immaculate Conception Church in Corinth (established in 1905) and Holy Infancy in Lake Luzerne (established circa 1874; originally a mission of the former); records of St. Bonaventure of Spiegeltown, St. John the Baptist and Church of the Holy Trinity both of Schaghticoke, all of which are in the Taconic Vicariate, held here
Parish of St. Isaac Jogues (Saratoga Lake) – Mission church of All Saints on the Hudson Parish of both Mechanicville and Stillwater in the Twin Rivers Vicariate
Masses held only from Memorial Day weekend "until the snow flies"
Our Lady of the Annunciation Church (Queensbury) – Established in 1970; formerly a mission of St. Mary's in Glens Falls
Our Lady of Hope Church (Whitehall) – Established in 2000 from a merger of Notre Dame des Victoires and Our Lady of Victory
Yoked with St. Ann's Church (Fort Ann) – Established in 1880; originally a mission parish
Mission: Chapel of the Assumption (Huletts Landing)
Masses only held during the summer months on Saturdays
Sacred Heart Church (Lake George) – Established in 1874
The Catholic Community of St. Cecilia (Warrensburg) – Established in 1874
St. Clements Church (Saratoga Springs) – Established in 1917; staffed by the Redemptorist Fathers
Mission: St. Therese (Gansevoort) – Established in 1965
Parish of St. Isaac Jogues (Hague/Chestertown) – Established in 2009 from a merger of Blessed Sacrament of Hague and St. John the Baptist in Chestertown:
Mission: St. James' Church (North Creek) – Established in 1884 
St. Joseph's Church (Fort Edward) – Established in 1869
St. Joseph's Church (Greenfield Center) – Established in 1940
Mission: St. Paul's Church (Rock City Falls)
St. Mary's Church (Ballston Spa) – Established in 1867; originally a mission of the Church of St. Peter of Saratoga Springs
Mission: St. Mary's Church (Galway)
Masses held between Memorial Day and Columbus Day
St. Mary's Church (Glens Falls) – Established in 1848; records from the former St. Alphonsus Church are held here
St. Mary's Church (Granville) – Established in 1867; formed from a merger of All Saints Church in Granville and Our Lady of Mount Carmel in Middle Granville
Church of St. Mary's/St. Paul's (Hudson Falls) – Established in 1830
St. Michael the Archangel Church (South Glens Falls) – Established in 1955
Church of St. Peter (Saratoga Springs) – Established in 1834; the first time that Catholics in Saratoga County came together to worship in a church.

Beverwyck Vicariate

Vicar: Very Reverend Mark G. Reamer, O.F.M., E.V.
All parishes listed are located in the City of Albany unless otherwise noted.
Cathedral of the Immaculate Conception (125 Eagle St. at Madison Ave.) – Mother church of the Diocese; established in 1848
All Saints Catholic Church (16 Homestead St.) – Established as a mission of St. Vincent de Paul's Church in 1920; formed from the merger of Holy Cross Church (established in 1942) and St. Margaret Mary (established in 1938) in 2009
Church of the Blessed Sacrament (607-609 Central Ave.) – Established in 1902; records of St. Casimir's, Our Lady of Angels, and St. Patrick's Churches held here
Mission: Shrine Church of Our Lady of Americas (Hispanic Catholic Apostolate) (273 Central Ave.) – Established in 1986
Christ, Our Light Church (Loudonville) – Established in 2009 from the merger of St. Francis de Sales in Loudonville and Our Lady of Mercy in Colonie
Christ the King Church (Guilderland) – Established in 1957
Church of Saint Clare (Colonie) – Established in 1940
Korean Catholic Apostolate (Colonie)
Our Lady of the Assumption Church (Latham) – Established in 1963 after the building which originally housed the church (Assumption of the Blessed Virgin Mary) was demolished to make way for the Empire State Plaza in Albany
Parish of Mater Christi (Hurst Ave. at Hopewell St) – Established in 1920; formed from the merger of St. Catherine of Siena and St. Teresa of Avila in 2009
Sacred Heart of Jesus (33 Walter St.) – Established in 1874; records of St. Joseph's Church held here
Vietnamese Apostolate – Originally part of St. Joseph's Church, which was absorbed by Sacred Heart of Jesus after its closing in 1994
Saint Ambrose Church (Latham) – Established in 1924
St. Francis of Assisi Parish (391 Delaware Ave. at St. James Place; 88 Fourth Ave. at Franklin St.) – Established in 1837; formed from the merger of St. John's-St. Ann's and St. James in 2010
St. Joan of Arc Roman Catholic Church (Black Catholic Apostolate) (Menands) – Established in 1927; BCA established in 1984
St. Lucy/St. Bernadette Church (Altamont) – Established in 1918
St. Mary's Church (10 Lodge St.) – Established in 1797
St. Matthew's Church (Voorheesville) – Established in 1961
St. Pius X Catholic Church (Loudonville) – Established in 1951
St. Thomas the Apostle Church (Delmar) – Established in 1907
St. Vincent de Paul's Church (900 Madison Ave. at Partridge St.) – Established in 1885

Hudson Valley Vicariate

Vicar: Very Reverend Anthony Barratt, E.V.
Church of St. Joseph (Stottville/Stuyvesant Falls) – Established in 2009
The Church of Saint Patrick (Ravena) – Established in 1859
Holy Trinity Parish – Established in 2009:
Church of St. Mary (Hudson)
Church of the Resurrection (Germantown)
Chapel of the Nativity of Our Lord (Linlithgo)
Immaculate Conception (New Lebanon) – Established in 1852
Mission: St. Joseph's Church (Stephentown) – Established in 1868; originally a mission of Sacred Heart in Berlin in 1928
Parish of Our Lady of Hope (Copake Falls) – Formed from merger of St. Bridget's in Copake Falls and St. John Vianney in Claverack in 2009
Sacred Heart Church (Cairo) – Established in 1895
Mission: Our Lady of Knock Shrine (East Durham)
Sacred Heart-Immaculate Conecption (Haines Falls/Palenville) – Established in 1907; formed through a merger in 2009
Mission: St. Francis de Sales (Elka Park)
St. James Church (Chatham) – Established in 1865
St. John the Baptist Church (Greenville) – Established in 1933
St. John the Baptist Church (Valatie) – Established in 1869
St. Mary's Church (Coxsackie) – Established in 1854
St. Patrick's Church (Athens) – Established in 1921
St. Patrick's Church (Catskill) – Established in 1859
St. Theresa of the Child Jesus Church (Windham) – Established in 1965
Mission: St. Joseph's Church (Ashland)

Leatherstocking Vicariate
Vicar: Very Rev. Michael Cambi
Holy Cross Church (Morris) – Established in 1948
Parish of Our Lady of the Valley (Middleburgh) – Established in 2009 from a merger of St. Catherine's in Middleburgh and St. Joseph's Church in Schoharie
Sacred Heart Church (Margaretville) – Established in 1920
Mission: St. Anne's Church (Andes)
Sacred Heart Church (Sidney) – Established in 1921
Sacred Heart Church (Stamford) – Established in 1890
Mission: St. Philip Neri (Grand Gorge)
St. John the Baptist Church (Walton) – Established in 1912
Yoked with St. Peter's Church (Delhi) – Established in 1850
Mission: Holy Family (Downsville)
St. Joseph's Church (Worcester) – Established in 1878
St. Mary's Our Lady of the Lake Catholic Church (Cooperstown) – Established in 1867
St. Mary's Church (Oneonta) – Established in 1883
St. Paul the Apostle (Hancock) – Established in 1888
St. Thomas the Apostle Church (Cherry Valley) – Established in 1903; records of Blessed Sacrament in Springfield Center and St. Mary's in Sharon Springs held here
St. Vincent de Paul's Church (Cobleskill) – Established in 1860

Mohawk Valley Vicariate

Vicar: Very Reverend Robert DeMartenis, E.V.
Annunciation Church (Ilion) – Established in 1868
Blessed Sacrament Church (Mohawk) – Established in 1916
Holy Family Parish  (Little Falls) – Established in 1842 as St. Mary's Church; merged with Sacred Heart (established in 1911) and St. Joseph's (established in 1923) in 1992
Yoked with St. Joseph's Church (Dolgeville) – Established in 1872
Church of the Holy Spirit (Gloversville) – Established in 2009 from merger of Sacred Heart and St. Mary of Mount Carmel
Church of Saints Anthony and Joseph (Herkimer) – Established in 1917
Yoked with St. John the Baptist Church (Newport) – Established in 1895
Holy Trinity Catholic Church (Johnstown)
Parish of Our Lady of Hope (Fort Plain) – Established in 2009 from a merger of St. James, Sts. Peter and Paul in Canajoharie, and St. Patrick's in St. Johnsville
Our Lady Queen of Apostles Church (Frankfort) – Established in 1927
Sacred Heart Church (Tribes Hill) – Established in 1879
St. Cecilia's Church (Fonda) – Established in 1882
St. Francis of Assisi (Northville) – Established in 1920
St. Francis de Sales Church (Herkimer) – Established in 1875
Parish of St. Joseph/St. Michael/Our Lady of Mt. Carmel (Amsterdam)
St. Joseph the Worker (Richfield Springs/West Winfield) – Established in 2009 from a merger of both St. Joseph's Churches
St. Joseph's Church (Broadalbin) – Established in 1875
St. Mary's Church (Amsterdam) – Established in 1838
Saint Stanislaus Parish (Amsterdam) – Established in 1894
St. Stephen's Church (Hagaman) – Established in 1923

Taconic Vicariate

Vicar: Very Reverend Richard Donovan, E.V.
All churches listed are in the City of Troy unless otherwise listed
Christ Sun of Justice (2125 Burdett Ave., across from the Houston Field House) – Established in 1969; parish of RPI, also seat to its Newman Foundation; located at the Chapel + Cultural Center at Rensselaer on the RPI campus
Church of the Holy Trinity (Cohoes) – Established in 1878; present parish formed from the merger of the Churches of St. Agnes, St. Marie (originally St. Joseph's Church), and St. Patrick's churches in 1998; St. Agnes and St. Patrick's had already merged by 1995. Yoked with St. Michael’s Church.
Holy Spirit Church (East Greenbush) – Established in 1923
Immaculate Conception (Hoosick Falls) – Established in 1867
Immaculate Heart of Mary (Watervliet/Green Island) – Established in 2005 from the merger of St. Patrick's Church in Watervliet and St. Joseph's in Green Island
 The Catholic Community of Our Lady of Victory (55 North Lake Ave.) – Established in 1922
 Mission: Parish of Our Lady of the Snow (Grafton)  – Established in 2009 from a merger of Sacred Heart in Berlin and St. John Francis Regis in Grafton; formerly a separate parish
 Sacred Heart Church (310 Spring Ave.) – Established in 1913; records of St. Francis de Sales and St. William's Churches held here
 Sacred Heart Church (Castleton-on-Hudson) – Established in 1887
St. Anthony of Padua Shrine Church (28 State St. at intersection with 3rd St.) – Established in 1892; staffed by Franciscan priests; records of St. Patrick's and St. Peter's churches are held here
St. Augustine's Church (25 115th St.) – Established in 1844
St. Henry's Church (Averill Park) – Established in 1868
Parish of St. John the Evangelist and St. Joseph (Rensselaer)  – Established in 1851 and 1916, respectively; merged in 2009
St. Joseph's Church (416 Third St. at Jackson St.) – Established in 1857; records of Church of the Holy Trinity and St. Mary's Church held here. One of the few parishes to celebrate the Latin Carmelite Rite.
St. Jude the Apostle (Wynantskill)  – Established in 1953
St. Mary's Church (Nassau)  – Established in 1852
St. Mary's Church at Clinton Heights (Rensselaer)  – Established in 1952
St. Mary of the Assumption Church (Waterford)  – Established in 1843; records of St. Ann's held here
St. Michael's Church (Cohoes) (Polish) – Established in 1904; yoked with Church of the Holy Trinity
St. Michael the Archangel Church (175 Williams Rd.; located in the Town of North Greenbush) – Established in 1874
Transfiguration Parish – Established in 2010 from a merger of the two churches listed below:
Church of the Holy Trinity (Schaghticoke)  – Established in 1845; formed in 2001 from a merger with St. John the Baptist (established in 1839), Our Lady of Good Counsel in Valley Falls (established in 1889), St. Monica's Church in Johnsonville (established in 1888)
St. Bonaventure's (Speigeltown)  – Established in 1970

Twin Rivers Vicariate

Vicar: Very Reverend James Belogi, E.V.
All churches are located in the City of Schenectady unless otherwise noted
All Saints on the Hudson Parish (Mechanicville/Stillwater) – St. Paul's Church in Mechanicville established in 1852; merged with Church of the Assumption in 1977 to form the Church of Assumption/St. Paul; merged with St. Peter's Church in Stillwater in 2011
Church of St. Adalbert (550 Lansing St.) – Established in 1903; yoked with Our Lady of Mt. Carmel and St. Paul the Apostle
Corpus Christi Church (Round Lake; located in the Town of Clifton Park) – Established in 1946
Immaculate Conception Church (Glenville) – Established in 1957
Our Lady of Fatima Church (Delanson) – Established in 1872; formerly a mission of the Church of St. Vincent dePaul in Cobleskill
Our Lady of Grace Church (Ballston Lake) – Established in 1922
Our Lady of Mount Carmel Church (1260 Pleasant St. at Hodgson St.) – Established in 1922; yoked with Church of St. Adalbert
Mission: St. Paul the Apostle Church (2733 Albany St. at Kings Rd.) – Established in 1922
Our Lady, Queen of Peace (Rotterdam) – Established in 2010 from a merger of Immaculate Conception (established in 1901) and Our Lady of the Assumption (established in 1933)
Mission: St. Margaret of Cortona (Rotterdam Junction) – Established in 1904; formerly a mission of St. Joseph's Church in Schenectady
St. Anthony's Church (Nott St. at Seward Pl.) – Established in 1902
St. Edward the Confessor Church (Clifton Park) – Established in 1967
St. Gabriel the Archangel Church (Rotterdam) – Established in 1956
St. John the Evangelist Church (812 Union St.) – Established in 1904
St. Joseph's Church (600 State St.) – Established in 1863
St. Joseph's Church (Scotia) – Established in 1907
St. Kateri Tekakwitha Parish – Established in 1926; parish formed in late 2012 from the merger of the Church of Our Lady of Fatima (2216 Rosa Road in Schenectady) and St. Helen's Church (1803 Union St in Niskayuna)
St. Luke's Church (1235 State St.) – Established in 1916
St. Madeleine Sophie Church (Guilderland) – Established in 1947
St. Mary's Church (Crescent) – Established in 1868; formerly a mission of St. Patrick's Church in Cohoes

Notes 
†.Parish practices the Extraordinary Form

References

External links
List of RCDA Parishes
Roman Catholic Diocese of Albany official website

Albany